The Huáyí yìyǔ refers to a series of vocabularies produced by Ming and Qing dynasty Chinese administration for the study of foreign languages. They are a precious source of phonological information, both for the study of Chinese pronunciation and for the study of the languages in question.

Categorization
The relevant works of the huáyí yìyǔ fall into four categories: A Sino-Mongolian vocabulary compiled by Huo Yuanjie (火源潔), 2. Vocabularies that were compiled and re-edited in the Siyiguan (四夷館). 3. Vocabularies prepared by the Huitongguan (會同館). 4. Qing dynasty vocabularies.

Languages covered in the Siyiguan

The languages covered by works in the second class include:

 韃靼 Mongolian
 女直 Jurchen
 西番 “Western Barbarians” (Tibetans of the Kham region)
 西天 languages of India
 回回 Persian,
 高昌 Uighur
 百夷 Daic languages
 緬甸 Burmese
 八百 Babai (Lanna)
 and 暹羅 Siamese.

Tatsuo Nishida published a book studying each, the Tibetan, Burmese,  Tosu and Lolo  languages as recorded in the Hua-yi yiu.

Languages covered in the Huitongguan

The languages covered by works in the third class covered: 

 朝鮮 Korean
 琉球 Ryukyuan
 日本 Japanese
 安南 (Annan) northern Vietnam
 暹羅 Siamese
 韃靼 Khitan (the Eastern Mongols)
 畏兀兒/委兀兒 Uighur
 滿剌加 Malaccan Malay
 占城 Champa of southern Vietnam
 西番 “Western Barbarians” (Tibetans of the Kham region)
 回回 Persian
 女直 Jurchen
 百夷 Baiyi

See also 
 Pearl in the Palm
 Pentaglot Dictionary

References 

Vocabulary